Boris Rousson (born June 14, 1970) is a Canadian former professional ice hockey goaltender. Since 2009 he has been an ice hockey coach. Rousson is currently the head coach of the Hamburger SV U16 in the German Schüler-Bundesliga (Students National League).

In 1992–93, his second professional season, Rousson played for the Binghamton Rangers, New York's AHL affiliate. The team posted the league's lowest goals-against average at 2.79 to win the Harry "Hap" Holmes Memorial Award for the lowest goals-against-average (shared with goaltending teammate Corey Hirsch).

Team Canada
Rousson was a member of Team Canada at the 1994 Spengler Cup and at the 2003 Deutschland Cup.

Awards and honours

References

External links

1970 births
Living people
Atlanta Fire Ants players
Binghamton Rangers players
Canadian ice hockey coaches
Canadian ice hockey goaltenders
Färjestad BK players
Granby Bisons players
Hamburg Freezers players
Ice hockey people from Quebec
Kassel Huskies players
Kölner Haie players
Laval Titan players
Lukko players
People from Val-d'Or
Canadian expatriate ice hockey players in Finland
Canadian expatriate ice hockey players in Germany
Canadian expatriate ice hockey players in Sweden